Stephopoma mamillatum is a species of sea snail, a marine gastropod mollusk in the family Vermetidae, the worm snails or worm shells.

Description

Distribution
This species occurs in the Atlantic Ocean off the Cape Verde islands.

References

 Rolán E., 2005. Malacological Fauna From The Cape Verde Archipelago. Part 1, Polyplacophora and Gastropoda.

Vermetidae
Gastropods described in 1960
Gastropods of Cape Verde